Yelena Maryassova (born 6 February 1997) is a Kazakhstani rhythmic gymnast.

She competed at the 2013 World Rhythmic Gymnastics Championships.

References 

Living people
1997 births